Bahrudin Atajić (born 16 November 1993) is a Bosnian professional footballer who plays as a striker for Maltese side Gżira United.

He was born and grew up in Sweden and holds dual citizenship.

Club career
Atajić signed for Celtic in January 2010 from Malmö FF. After years playing for the under-20 and development squads, Atajić signed a new contract with the club in 2013 that would keep him until the end of the season. He made his senior debut on 19 May 2013, in the Scottish Premier League. He scored his first goal for Celtic in a 5–0 rout of Motherwell at Fir Park on 6 December 2013. After the match, Atajić said: "I came on against Motherwell earlier in the season for the last 12 minutes and managed to score a goal. It was my first senior goal and obviously I was delighted with that."

He signed for English Football League One club Shrewsbury Town on loan on 24 January 2014. One day later, Atajić made his Shrewsbury debut, where he came on as a substitute for Tom Eaves in the 90th minute, as Shrewsbury Town lose 3–1 to Swindon Town. On 17 February 2014, Atajić was left out of the squad by Michael Jackson, citing his concerns with Atajić's fitness. For the remainder of the season, Atajić's playing time was slightly reduced and he went on to make thirteen appearances despite being on the bench.

Following his return with Shrewsbury Town came to an end, Atajić returned to Celtic and made several appearances in friendly matches, but was released in September 2014 after making four appearances in the league.

In February 2015, he signed one-year deal with SJK with an option to prolong for following year.

Before the 2016 season Atajić signed a contract with Žalgiris - defending champions of Lithuanian A Lyga. He helped his club to win domestic quadruple in 2016.

He joined Maltese side Gzira United in January 2021.

International career
Although born in Sweden, Atajić has committed to play for Bosnia and Herzegovina on all levels of the game.

He was capped for the first time for Bosnia U21s in May 2014.

Personal life
Atajić's family hails from Bosanska Gradiška, Bosnia and Herzegovina.

Career statistics

References

External links

1993 births
Living people
People from Västervik Municipality
Swedish people of Bosnia and Herzegovina descent
Citizens of Bosnia and Herzegovina through descent
Association football forwards
Swedish footballers
Bosnia and Herzegovina footballers
Bosnia and Herzegovina under-21 international footballers
Celtic F.C. players
Shrewsbury Town F.C. players
Seinäjoen Jalkapallokerho players
FK Žalgiris players
Landskrona BoIS players
FK Mladost Doboj Kakanj players
Gżira United F.C. players
Scottish Premier League players
English Football League players
Veikkausliiga players
A Lyga players
Superettan players
Premier League of Bosnia and Herzegovina players
Bosnia and Herzegovina expatriate footballers
Expatriate footballers in Scotland
Expatriate footballers in England
Bosnia and Herzegovina expatriate sportspeople in England
Expatriate footballers in Finland
Bosnia and Herzegovina expatriate sportspeople in Finland
Expatriate footballers in Lithuania
Bosnia and Herzegovina expatriate sportspeople in Lithuania
Expatriate footballers in Sweden
Bosnia and Herzegovina expatriate sportspeople in Sweden
Expatriate footballers in Malta
Bosnia and Herzegovina expatriate sportspeople in Malta
Sportspeople from Kalmar County